Sina Queyras is a Canadian writer. To date they have published seven collections of poetry, a novel and an essay collection.

Personal life 
Sina Queyras was born in Nisichawayasihk Cree Nation, Manitoba, Canada. Their growing up took place on the road on Anishinabe, Ininew, Oji-Cree, Dene, Dakota, Kootenai, Kitsumkalum, Kitselas and the Ts’msyen (Tsimshian) territories in Winnipeg, Kaslo, and Terrace, Western Canada. Sina also studied and lived in Vancouver, Toronto, Montreal, New York, Philadelphia, and Calgary where they were Markin Flanagan Writer in Residence.

Life and career
In 2005, while living in New York, they edited Open Field: 30 Contemporary Canadian Poets for Persea Books, the first anthology of Canadian poetry to be published by a U.S. press. They later edited Canadian Strange, a folio of contemporary Canadian writing for Drunken Boat, where they are a contributing editor. From 2005 to 2007 Queyras co-curated the belladonna* reading series in New York.

Their third collection of poetry, Lemon Hound, received the Pat Lowther Award and a Lambda Literary Award for Lesbian Poetry, and their fourth, Expressway, was a shortlisted finalist for the Governor General's Award for English-language poetry at the 2009 Governor General's Awards. A selection from Expressway won Gold prize in the National Magazine Awards.

They published their first novel, Autobiography of Childhood, in 2011. The book was a shortlisted finalist for the amazon.ca First Novel Award.

Their 2014 poetry collection MxT was again shortlisted for the Lambda Literary Award for Lesbian Poetry, and won the A. M. Klein Prize for Poetry from the Quebec Writers' Federation Awards and the ReLit Award for Poetry. A translation by Marie Frankland was shortlisted for the Governor General's Award for English to French translation at the 2015 Governor General's Awards.

Their work has been published widely in journals and anthologies including Joyland: A hub for short fiction. They teach creative writing at Concordia University in Montreal, where they reside, and have taught at Haverford College and Rutgers University. Queyras also curates Writers Read, having hosted such writers as Lydia Davis, Rae Armantrout, Tanya Tagaq, Renee Gladman, Claudia Rankine and Dionne Brand.

Works

Novel
Autobiography of Childhood (2011)

Essays
 Unleashed (2010)

Poetry
 Someone from the Hollow (1995)
 Slip (2001)
 Teethmarks (2004)
 Lemon Hound (2006)
 Expressway (2009)
 MxT (2014)
 My Ariel (2017)

Anthologies
 Open Field: 30 Contemporary Canadian Poets (2005)

Plays
The Outing (1996)

See also

Canadian literature
Canadian poetry
List of Canadian poets

References

External links
 Official website
 Lemon Hound 

1963 births
Living people
Canadian women poets
Canadian women novelists
Canadian women dramatists and playwrights
Academic staff of Concordia University
Canadian lesbian writers
Lambda Literary Award for Lesbian Poetry winners
21st-century Canadian novelists
21st-century Canadian poets
21st-century Canadian dramatists and playwrights
21st-century Canadian women writers
Canadian LGBT poets
Canadian LGBT novelists
Canadian LGBT dramatists and playwrights
Lesbian dramatists and playwrights
Lesbian novelists
21st-century Canadian LGBT people